The Edwin H. Land Medal is jointly presented by The Optical Society and the Society for Imaging Science and Technology (IS&T). The Land Medal was established in 1992 to honor the noted scientist and entrepreneur Edwin H. Land, who is noted for his invention of instant photography, for founding the Polaroid Corporation, and for developing the theory of Retinex, amongst many other accomplishments. It is funded by the Polaroid Foundation, the Polaroid Retirees Association and by individual contributors Manfred Heiting, Theodore Voss and John J. McCann.  The medal honors individuals who, using the science of optics, "have demonstrated pioneering entrepreneurial activity that has had a major impact on the public."

Recipients

See also

 List of physics awards

External links
 Edwin H. Land Medal, The Optical Society

References

Awards of Optica (society)
Academic awards
Science and technology awards